The Queens Ledger is a weekly newspaper had been headquartered in Maspeth, New York,  for 140-years and is now headquartered in Woodside, Queens. The news group publishes eight weekly newspapers including The Greenpoint Star, Brooklyn Downtown Star, The Leader Observer of Woodhaven, Glendale Register, Astoria/LIC Journal, Forest Hills Times and Queens Examiner. The Queens Ledger Newspaper is published every Thursday on 42 newsstands and serves many areas in Queens including Maspeth, Middle Village, Woodside, Elmhurst, and Ridgewood. The Queens Ledger printed newspapers have a circulation of 150,000, and is published weekly. Its publisher, since 1986, is Walter H. Sanchez of BQE Media.

History 
The Queens Ledger was founded in 1873, and combined with the Long Island Register in 1941.

Queens Ledger columnist Frank Borzellieri wrote a column comparing Queens representative of the New York Board of Education Terri Thomson to Adolf Hitler in July 2000. Borzellieri was originally suspended, but later that year, publisher Walter Sanchez rehired him even though Borzellieri refused to apologize. Sanchez cited his reasoning to many readers expressing their interest in Borzellieri's columns and opinions. As a result, Sanchez and the Queens Ledger received a lot of scrutiny, specifically from the Anti-Defamation League.

Significant coverage 
In 1990, a public hearing was held in Long Island City, New York regarding the expansion of the Queens Boulevard subway line (F train) into 63rd street in Manhattan. There were many well known newspapers from the New York were covering the public hearing, such as the New York Times, and the Queens Ledger was among those newspapers.

The environmental impacts of improvements on the Long Island Expressway in Queens was heavily discussed in 1984, and the Queens Ledger, along with the New York Times and the New York Daily News, was one of the newspapers to cover it.

Sister papers
In addition to the Queens Ledger, BQE Media also publishes the:
Greenpoint Star & Brooklyn Northside News
Leader/Observer (South Queens)
Glendale Register
Long Island City/Astoria Journal
Forest Hills Times
Queens Examiner (Eastern Queens)
Brooklyn Downtown Star

Its publisher and his family also owns The Wave of Long Island and The Rockland County Times

References 

Newspapers published in Queens, New York
Weekly newspapers published in the United States